Le Huilin (Simplified Chinese:, born 1 April 1989) is a Chinese fencer from Sha County. She competed in the women's foil event at the 2016 Summer Olympics.

References

External links
 

1989 births
Living people
Chinese female fencers
Chinese female foil fencers
Olympic fencers of China
Fencers at the 2016 Summer Olympics
Fencers from Fujian
People from Sanming
Asian Games medalists in fencing
Fencers at the 2010 Asian Games
Fencers at the 2014 Asian Games
Asian Games silver medalists for China
Asian Games bronze medalists for China
Medalists at the 2010 Asian Games
Medalists at the 2014 Asian Games
21st-century Chinese women